The Malaysian hawk-cuckoo or Malay hawk-cuckoo (Hierococcyx fugax) is a bird in the family Cuculidae formerly considered conspecific with Hodgson's hawk-cuckoo and the rufous hawk-cuckoo. All three species were previously assigned as Cuculus fugax.

Geographic Range

Hierococcyx fugax is found in far southern Burma, southern Thailand, Malaya, Singapore, Borneo, Sumatra and western Java.

Habitat
The Malaysian hawk-cuckoo occurs in a variety of forest types from plains level up to 1700 metres on Sumatra. It can also be found in cocoa and rubber plantations.

Diet and Foraging 
Insects, mainly caterpillars, but also cicadas, beetles, small butterflies and locusts, in addition fruits and berries. Active in bushes and understorey, gleaning prey from foliage.

Behaviour
Hawk-cuckoos are brood parasites and recorded hosts include the white-rumped shama and the grey-headed canary flycatcher.

References

Malaysian hawk-cuckoo
Birds of Malesia
Malaysian hawk-cuckoo